Male priče o velikoj ljubavi is the fourth studio album by Yugoslav rock band Zabranjeno Pušenje released in 1989. It was released through Diskoton in SFR Yugoslavia. This was the last album before splitting up of the band in early 1990.

The album was re-released in 1999 through TLN-Europa.

Track listing
Source: Discogs

Personnel
Credits adapted from the album's liner notes.

Zabranjeno pušenje
 Nele Karajlić – lead vocals
 Sejo Sexon – rhythm guitar, backing vocals
 Predrag Kovačević Kova – lead guitar
 Dado Džihan – keyboards, backing vocals
 Darko Ostojić Minka – bass, backing vocals
 Faris Arapović – drums

Additional musicians
 Tamara Štrelof – vocals (track A3)
 Željko Babić – accordion
 Benjamin Isović – backing vocals
 Goran Petranović (credited as Rizo Kurtović) – backing vocals
 Srđan Velimirović – backing vocals
 Darko Poljak – saxophone
 Dejan Sparavalo – violin
 Muhamed Adaš – violin

Production
 Sejo Sexon – production
 Predrag Kovačević Kova – supervisor
 Mufid Kosović – recording (RTV Sarajevo Studio 1 in Sarajevo, YUG)
 Kiki Zurovac – manager

Design
 Srđan Velimirović – design
 Dragoslav Popović – photos
 Srđan Badrov – photos

References

1989 albums
Zabranjeno Pušenje albums